16S rRNA (cytosine1402-N4)-methyltransferase (RsmH, MraW) is an enzyme with systematic name S-adenosyl-L-methionine:16S rRNA (cytosine1402-N4)-methyltransferase. This enzyme catalyses the following chemical reaction

 S-adenosyl-L-methionine + cytosine1402 in 16S rRNA  S-adenosyl-L-homocysteine + N4-methylcytosine1402 in 16S rRNA

RsmH catalyses the N4-methylation of cytosine1402.

References

External links 

EC 2.1.1